Gordon Francis Stirling (28 December 1924 – 11 June 1999) was an Australian politician. He was the Labor member for Williamstown in the Victorian Legislative Assembly from 1973 to 1988.

Career

Stirling worked as a moulder before joining the Royal Australian Navy in 1946. He served as an Able Seaman aboard  during the Korean War, reached the rank of Petty Officer, then completed his service in 1958. In 1962 he joined the Labor Party.

Stirling's political activity led to a career as a unionist, becoming an official of the Federated Storemen and Packers Union. He was a member of the Australia-USSR Friendship Society as well as the Congress for International Cooperation and Disarmament. He was also involved in the Williamstown Historical Society, the Williamstown branch of the Returned and Services League, and he was a member of the Williamstown Hospital board.

Stirling was elected to the Victorian Electoral district of Williamstown at the 1973 State election, won by the Liberal party under new leader Rupert Hamer. He served on Labor's Public Works Committee from 1976 to 1982 and the Salinity and Printing committees from 1974 to 1983, and was a member of the Victorian Institute of Marine Sciences board. He retired in August 1988, a month before John Cain II's narrow re-election to a third term.

References

External links
Gordon Stirling at re-member
Gordon Stirling's Korean War Service Record at Dept of Veterans' Affairs

1924 births
1999 deaths
Australian Labor Party members of the Parliament of Victoria
Members of the Victorian Legislative Assembly
Politicians from Geelong
Australian trade unionists
Moldmakers
20th-century Australian politicians
Royal Australian Navy sailors
Australian military personnel of the Korean War